Ronald Edwin Stedman (3 June 1927 – 16 October 2022) was a British swimmer. He competed in the men's 100 metre freestyle at the 1948 Summer Olympics. He won the 1948 and 1949 ASA National Championship 100 metres freestyle title.

Stedman died on 16 October 2022, at the age of 95.

References

1927 births
2022 deaths
20th-century British people
British male swimmers
Olympic swimmers of Great Britain
Swimmers at the 1948 Summer Olympics
People from Bromley
Sportspeople from Kent
British male freestyle swimmers